Sharafeh or Sharfeh may refer to:
 Sharafeh, Ardabil
 Sharafeh, East Azerbaijan
 Sharfeh, East Azerbaijan
 Sharafeh, Ilam